The 1930–31 Cornell Big Red men's ice hockey season was the 26th season of play for the program. The teams was coached by Nick Bawlf in his 11th season.

Season
Cornell began the season having to contend with extended periods of thaw that prevented them from getting much practice in before the winter break. The Big Red were quick out of the gate, winning their first match of the year 7–2. The offense continued to play well in the second game, scoring the first 4 goal against Rensselaer before the Engineers nearly stormed back, ending the match with a 5–3 win.

The team returned after the semester break and picked up right where they left off, winning their third game of the season 4–2. The team suffered a serious loss when their leading goal scorer McKowne was ruled ineligible after the game. captain Clark was shifted to center while Walsh took over on defense. The result was the Big Red got shut out in their next game, ending their winning streak against Williams.

The team recovered for their final game of the season, but still faced a formidable opponent in Clarkson. Cornell lost their last game of the season, but they were still able to finish with a winning record. This was the first time in program history that the Big Red were able to string two winning seasons together. The team wouldn't be able to repeat that feat until 1965.

Owing to the lack of available ice, Cornell was forced to cancel all games over the next two seasons. They finally resumed play in 1934.

Roster

Standings

Schedule and results

|-
!colspan=12 style=";" | Regular Season

Scoring statistics

Note: Assists were not recorded as a statistic.

References

Cornell Big Red men's ice hockey seasons
Cornell
Cornell
Cornell
Cornell